Daaku is a 2006 Canadian crime fiction novel by Ranj Dhaliwal.

Synopsis
In the violent and ruthless world of Indo–Canadian gangs, Ruby Pandher is on his way up. A self–described daaku (Punjabi for outlaw), Ruby learns young that might, in the form of his drunken father's fists, is right, and that money is easier to steal than earn. Ruby's small–time scams reveal a knack for leadership and after his first stint in youth detention, the big–timers start to notice his potential.

Soon, Ruby is doing collections for Indo–Canadian drug dealers. Now "known to police," Ruby is drawn into a gang war just as he's trying to beat the rap on weapons charges and theft –– while simultaneously organizing a jailhouse smuggling ring. On the cusp of adulthood, and surrounded by Punjabi terrorists, bikers and Indo–Canadian gangsters, Ruby is drawn like a moth to the glamour of power, money, and drugs.

A story of betrayal, cold–blooded murder and the rise and eventual fall of one gangster, Daaku is a bullet–riddled grand tour of Indo–Canadian gangland.

Reception
Daaku has been compared to Martin Scorsese's Goodfellas and S.E. Hinton's The Outsiders, "Daaku provides a fascinating look into the gang world's twisted morality, casual murder, commodification of women, and the inevitability of violent demise." says website "Quill and Quire"

References

2006 Canadian novels
Canadian crime novels
Novels about organized crime
Books by Ranj Dhaliwal